Johan Müller may refer to:

 Johan Müller (politician), Estonian politician
 Johan Muller von Konigsberg (or Regiomontanus), German mathematician, astrologer and astronomer

See also
 Johann Müller (disambiguation)